Ndao may refer to:
 Ndaw, typical Gambian and Senegalese patronym of the Serer people
 Ndao Island, Indonesia